Torremanzanas or La Torre de les Maçanes is a municipality in the comarca of Alacantí in the Valencian Community, Spain. It owes its name to an ancient Almohad fortification located in the upper part of the town (valencian "Torre", english "Tower") and evokes a tradition of hospitality since "Maçanes" means inns.

References

External links

Municipalities in the Province of Alicante